Benjamin Small is a British voice actor who has acted on animated films and television shows, including Thomas the Tank Engine and Toby the Tram Engine in the UK dub of the children's television series Thomas & Friends.

Career
Small voiced Thomas in the UK version of the CGI episodes of the children's television series Thomas & Friends. Small also voiced Toby (in which he based the character's voice on Dad's Army actor Clive Dunn) and Ferdinand in the UK version while voicing Rheneas, Flynn, the Troublesome Trucks and Owen in both the UK and US versions of the series.

In the US version, Small voiced Stanley and Charlie, who are voiced by Small's co-star Matt Wilkinson in the UK.

As well as Thomas & Friends, Small and fellow actor Keith Wickham previously collaborated by providing the British voices for Watch My Chops from 2004-2006.

Prior to that, Small was the voice of Clifford the Big Red Dog's best friend: "T-Bone". He also was the voice of Jorge/George and Shun in the spin-off Clifford's Puppy Days.

Small also voiced Zorro in the animated television series Zorro: Generation Z and voiced Spuddy in Lewis and Friends.

Filmography

Film

The Hunted Pumpkin of Sleepy Hallow (2003) - Ichabod Crane
The Christmas Dinosaur (2004) - Additional voices
Alice in Wonderland: What's the Matter with Hatter? (2007) (BKN Classic Series trilogy)
The Prince and the Pauper: Double Trouble (2007) (BKN Classic Series trilogy)
Hero of the Rails (2009) - Thomas and Toby (UK dub)
Misty Island Rescue (2010) - Thomas, Toby and Ferdinand (UK dub)
Day of the Diesels (2011) - Thomas and Toby (UK dub) / Stanley (US dub) 
Blue Mountain Mystery (2012) - Thomas and Toby (UK dub) / Rheneas and Owen
King of the Railway (2013) - Thomas and Toby (UK dub) / Rheneas and the Troublesome Trucks
Tale of the Brave (2014) - Thomas (UK dub) / Troublesome Trucks

Television
Franklin (1997–2004) - Bear (UK dub)
Clifford the Big Red Dog (2002–04) - T-Bone (UK dub)
Xcalibur (2001–02) - Herik 
Make Way for Noddy (2002–2009) - Mr. Sparks, Mr. Jumbo, Mr. Wobbly Man, Sly and Gobbo (UK dub)
Lunar Jim (2006-2013) - Jim (UK dub)
Clifford's Puppy Days (2003–2006) - Jorge/George and Shun
Watch My Chops (2004–2006) - Bernie Barges (UK dub)
Harry and His Bucket Full of Dinosaurs (2005) - Pterence and Sid (UK dub)
Zorro: Generation Z (2008) - Zorro, Diego Dela Vega
Dork Hunters from Outer Space (2008) - Romeo
Thomas & Friends (2009–2015) - Thomas, Toby and Ferdinand (UK dub) / Stanley and Charlie (US dub) / Rheneas, Flynn, Owen and the Troublesome Trucks
Pet Squad (2011) - Dodge
Matt Hatter Chronicles (2012) - Craw
Doc McStuffins (2012) - Mr. McStuffins (UK dub)

Video games
Zorro: Generation Z (2004) - Diego de la Vega / Zorro
Alias (2004) - Additional voices

References

External links
 
 Ben Small

Living people
20th-century British male actors
21st-century British male actors
British male voice actors
Year of birth missing (living people)